Academy of Maritime Education and Training (AMET) is an private Deemed university located in Chennai, Tamil Nadu, India. The institute is dedicated for maritime education and training. It is one of its kind technology oriented institute of higher education in India dedicated for maritime Studies. It comes under the section 3 of the University Grants Commission Act, 1956.

History 
It was founded in 1993, dedicated to maritime studies. In the early years, AMET collaborated with international maritime colleges like South Tyneside College, Hull College, Glasgow College of Nautical Sciences etc. During the early stages, AMET was an off-campus institution of  Birla Institute of Technology Mesra.  In 2007 AMET was given university status by the Ministry of HRD. The Department of Naval Architecture was founded in 2007.

Academic divisions, departments, and centres

National/international collaborations 
AMET has collaborations with universities and academies in India and abroad. AMET conducts HND programs in collaboration with South Tyneside College (UK) and Glasgow College of Nautical Sciences (UK). The Department Naval architecture has collaboration with the universities of Glasgow and Strathclyde, UK. AMET conducts degrees in collaboration with the University of Plymouth, UK. The university has a tie-up with IIT Madras, DNV Academy India,.AMET has signed a Memorandum of understanding with World Maritime University on 22 February 2013.

Awards 
 AMET was awarded "Emerging maritime university of the year" on 2013 by Ministry of Human Resource Development, Govt.of India.
 AMET was awarded "Best Maritime Institute" in 2013 by Lloyd's List Middle East and Indian Subcontinent. 
 SME Rating Agency of India Rated AMET's seagoing courses with a Grade-1 in 2012

Ranking 

As per International Association of Maritime universities AMET was ranked 3rd in worldwide overall bench marking 2019–20. AMET also came second in research Bench marking.

Admissions process 
Admissions for AMET are based on All India level online exams. The preliminary round of entrance examinations are done online, and the next round is held after shortlisting the candidates at the university campus .

Facilities 

AMET uses a model ship in campus near water, the Jewel of AMET.  A Polaris bridge simulator is on campus for training students of Nautical science.

References

External links 

 

Educational institutions established in 1992
Universities in Chennai
1992 establishments in Tamil Nadu